The Société Nouvelle des Forges et Chantiers de la Méditerranée (FCM) was a French shipbuilding company. The Société des Forges et Chantiers de la Méditerranée was founded in 1853 by Philip Taylor and subsequently incorporated in 1856 in the newly established joint stock company Société Nouvelle des Forges et Chantiers de la Méditerranée founded by Armand Béhic. It eventually had shipyards in La Seyne-sur-Mer, near Toulon, and in Graville, now part of Le Havre. After going into insolvency in 1966, the company was absorbed into the Constructions industrielles de la Méditerranée.

The company also produced tanks before World War II, most notably FCM 2C and FCM 36.

Some ships built
  (1865) — first ironclad to circumnavigate the Earth
  (1874)
 Brazilian monitor Solimões (1875)
 (1879)
  (1879)
 Spanish ironclad battleship  (1888)
  (1889)
  (1889)
 Chilean cruiser Presidente Errázuriz (1890)
 Chilean cruiser Presidente Pinto (1890) - shipwreck 1905
  (1890)
  (1890)
  (1891)
 Haitian gunboat Alexandre-Pétion (1893)
 
  (1896) — since 1927 Polish barracks ship 
  (1900) 
 Russian pre-dreadnought  (1902)
   (1906)
 British hospital ship  (1911)
 French dreadnought  (1912)
 French passenger liner  (1913) — sunk in the Patria disaster in 1940
 French battleship  (1914) — later converted to an aircraft carrier
 French passenger liner  (1915)
 French submarine  (1929)
  (1935)
 Norwegian cruise ship Sagafjord (1965) — later the British Saga Rose
 Dutch / Dutch Antilles LPG-tanker Antilla Bay, #1396, (1973)

External links
 
 History of the shipyards of La Seyne during the 19th century (in French)
 

Shipbuilding companies of France
Shipyards of France